Henry Bauchau (22 January 1913 – 21 September 2012) was a Belgian psychoanalyst, lawyer, and author of French prose and poetry.

Biography
Henry Bauchau was born in Mechelen, Belgium on 22 January 1913. He became a trial lawyer in Brussels in 1936 and was a member of the Belgian Resistance in the Ardennes during World War II.

He was married to Mary Kozyrev; their son is the actor Patrick Bauchau. They lived for a time in Gstaad, Switzerland.

Bauchau died in Paris, France on 21 September 2012, aged 99.

Publishing
From 1945 to 1951 he worked in publishing. In 1946, he moved to Paris.
He was a friend of Albert Camus, André Gide, Jacques Lacan, and Jacques Derrida.

Awards
 1990 Royal Academy of Belgian Literature
 2002 International Latin Union prize of Romance Language Literatures

Works
 Géologie (1958; "Geology"), 1958
 Gengis Khan, Mermod, 1960 (reprint Actes sud, 1989)
 La Machination (1969; "The Plot"), (play)
 Œdipe sur la route, Actes Sud, 1990, 
 
 La Chine intérieure (1974; "Inner China") (poems)
 Essai sur la vie de Mao Tsé-toung, Flammarion, 1982, 
 Poésie: 1950-1984, Actes Sud, 1986
 Le régiment noir, Éperonniers, 1987
 Diotime et les lions: récit, Actes Sud, 1991, 
 L'écriture et la circonstance, Presses universitaires de Louvain, UCL, 1992
 Antigone: roman, Actes Sud, 1997, 
 La déchirure (English: The Tear), Editions Labor, 1998, 
 Journal d'Antigone: 1989-1997, Actes Sud, 1999
 L'enfant bleu: roman, Actes sud, 2004, 
 Le boulevard périphérique: roman, Actes sud, 2008, 
 Déluge, Actes sud, 2010,

References

Bibliography
 Surmonte, Emilia, Antigone, La Sphinx d'Henry Bauchau: Les enjeux d'une création (Bruxelles etc., Peter Lang, 2011) (Documents pour l'Histoire des Francophonies. Europe, 24).

1913 births
2012 deaths
Writers from Mechelen
Belgian writers in French
Belgian male writers
Psychoanalysts
Prix du Livre Inter winners
Members of the Académie royale de langue et de littérature françaises de Belgique
Belgian expatriates in France